The French frigate Alcmène was an  of a nominal 44 guns, launched in 1811. The British captured her on 1814. The Royal Navy named her HMS Dunira, and then renamed her HMS Immortalite but never commissioned her nor fitted her for sea. In March 1822 she became a receiving ship at Portsmouth. She was sold in January 1837.

Capture

Venerable joined her and after a chase that left Cyane far behind, captured Alcmène, though not without a fight. Venerable lost two men dead and four wounded, while the French lost 32 dead and 50 wounded. Alcmène had a complement of 319 men under the command of Commander Ducrest de Villeneuve, who was wounded when he brought her alongside Venerable and attempted a boarding.

Jason and Cyane tracked Iphigénie and initially fired on her but broke off the engagement because they were outgunned. Cyane continued the chase for over three days until Venerable was able to rejoin the fight after having sailed 153 miles in the direction she believed that Iphigénie had taken. On 20 January 1814, Venerable captured Iphigénie, having again left Cyane behind. Iphigénie apparently did not resist after Venerable came up. Before meeting up with the British ships, the two French vessels had taken some eight prizes. The action resulted in the award in 1847, to any surviving claimants, of the Naval General Service Medal with clasps "Venerable 16 Jany 1814" and "Cyane 16 Jany. 1814".

Venerable was able to locate Iphigénie because Commander Ducrest de Villeneuve of Alcmène was so angry at Captain Émeric, who was the senior French commander, for not having come alongside Venerable on the other side also to board, that he essentially revealed the rendezvous instructions to Admiral Durham. (Venerable was Durham's flagship). When some prisoners from Iphigénies crew were brought on Venerable, crew from Alcmène too were enraged. Durham had to station Royal Marines between them, with fixed bayonets, to prevent fighting from breaking out.

Fate
The Royal Navy never commissioned Alcmène. The Admiralty initially named her Dunira.  On 8 July, Lieutenant Edward Boys, formerly of Venerable, was confirmed in command of Dunira, but was put on half-pay in September. Then on 8 November the Admiralty renamed her Immortalite.

Immortalite became a receiving ship at Portsmouth in March 1822. She may have served for a while in the Quarantine Service at Standgate Creek. She was sold in January 1837 to a Mr. W. Goldsworthy for £1,610.

Notes

Citations

References
James, William & Frederick Chamier (1837) The naval history of Great Britain : from the declaration of war by France in 1793 to the accession of George IV. (London: R. Bentley).
 
O'Byrne, William Richard (1849), Naval Biographical Dictionary
 
 

Frigates of the Royal Navy
1811 ships
Ships built in France
Captured ships